List of Peckett and Sons railway locomotives, plus those from Fox Walker, both built at the Atlas Engine Works, Bristol.

Despite hard work and poor maintenance, the engines were long-lasting, and many Peckett locomotives survive working on today's heritage railways. The oldest surviving Fox Walker locomotive is Karlskoga, an 0-6-0ST of 1873 which was returned to steam at Nora, Sweden in 1982.

References

Notes

External links

Data and photographs

Locomotives

Peckett
Peckett and Sons locomotives